Cor blimey or gorblimey may refer to:

 A British slang phrase for an exclamation of surprise
 Cor, Blimey!, a 2000 television film and a spin-off of the Carry On comedy franchise
 Gorblimey Press, founded by Barry Windsor-Smith
 "Gor blimey" cap, a type of peaked cap worn by British soldiers in the First World War

See also
"My Old Man's a Dustman" (who wears gorblimey trousers)